The Togo paradise whydah (Vidua togoensis) is a species of bird in the family Viduidae.
It is found in Benin, Cameroon, Chad, Ivory Coast, Ghana, Mali, Sierra Leone, and Togo.

References

External links
 The Paradise Whydahs Species Factsheet

Togo paradise whydah
Birds of West Africa
Togo paradise whydah
Togo paradise whydah
Taxonomy articles created by Polbot